Deara is a census town in the Barasat II CD block in the Barasat Sadar subdivision in the North 24 Parganas district in the Indian state of West Bengal. It is close to Kolkata and also a part of Kolkata Urban Agglomeration.

Geography

Location

Area overview
The area covered in the map alongside is largely a part of the north Bidyadhari Plain. located in the lower Ganges Delta. The country is flat. It is a little raised above flood level and the highest ground borders the river channels.54.67% of the people of the densely populated area lives in the urban areas and 45.33% lives in the rural  areas.

Note: The map alongside presents some of the notable locations in the subdivision. All places marked in the map are linked in the larger full screen map.

Demographics
 India census, Deara had a population of 11,994; of this, 6,018 are male, 5,976 female. It has an average literacy rate of 60.64%, lower than the national average of 74.04%.

Infrastructure
As per te District Census Handbook 2011, Deara covered an area of 2.5461 km2. It had 5 primary schools, the nearest middle and secondary schools were 5 km away at Rohanda, the nearest senior secondary school was 3 km away at Rajarhat and the nearest degree college was 6 km away at Kalipark. The nearest hospital was 22 km away, the nearest dispensary/ health centre (without any bed) was 3 km away, the nearest family welfare centre was 4 km away, the nearest maternity and child welfare centre was 4 km away and the nearest maternity home was 4 km away.

Transport
Local roads link Deara to State Highway 3.

Healthcare
North 24 Parganas district has been identified as one of the areas where ground water is affected by arsenic contamination.

See also
Map of Barasat II CD Block on Page 419 of District Census Handbook.

References

Cities and towns in North 24 Parganas district